Santaluces Community High School is a school located in Lantana, Florida, United States. It was opened in 1982 and is managed by the Palm Beach County School District, Florida.

Notable alumni 
Joe Pags Pagliarulo, 1982, Radio Talk Show Host for the Joe Pags Show, iHeartRadio, Newsmax TV
Carlos Jenkins, 1986, Linebacker for the Minnesota Vikings, St. Louis Rams
Oscar Isaac, 1998, Actor/Musician
C. J. Jones, 1999, Wide receiver for the Denver Broncos
Vince Wilfork, 2000, Defensive tackle for the New England Patriots, Houston Texans
Angela Yungk, 2001, Publisher of Art Hive Magazine/Actress
Kevin Fielder, 2019, Sports Writer for Owls247 and Underdog Dynasty

References 

Educational institutions established in 1982
High schools in Palm Beach County, Florida
Public high schools in Florida
1982 establishments in Florida